Dragan "Gagi" Jovanović (born 10 October 1977) is a Serbian heavyweight kickboxer, multiple W.A.K.O. European and World champion, and W.A.K.O. Pro Full-Contact Rules European Champion.

He challenged Alban Galonnier for W.A.K.O. Pro Low Kick Rules Super Heavyweight World Title on 15 May 2008 in Serbia, losing the fight by 3rd-round TKO.

Titles
2012 W.A.K.O. European Championships  +91 kg 
2012 W.A.K.O. World Cup  +91 kg 
2011 W.A.K.O World Championships  +91 kg 
2011 W.A.K.O Balkans Championships  +91 kg 
2011 Serbia Open Cup Champion +91 kg
2009 W.A.K.O World Championships  +91 kg 
2009 W.A.K.O. World Cup  +91 kg 
2008 W.A.K.O. European Championships  +91 kg 
2007 W.A.K.O. World Championships  +91 kg 
2006 W.A.K.O. European Championships  +91 kg 
2005 2005 W.A.K.O. World Championships  +91 kg 
2004 W.A.K.O. Balkans Championships  
2004 W.A.K.O. Pro Full-Contact Rules European Champion
2002 W.A.K.O. European Championships  +91 kg 
2001 W.A.K.O. World Championships  +91 kg 
2001 W.A.K.O. Balkans Championships  
Multiple Low-Kick and Thai-Boxing champion of Serbia
Multiple Low-Kick and Thai-Boxing champion of Serbia and Montenegro

Kickboxing record

Legend:

Boxing record

See also
List of WAKO Amateur World Championships
List of WAKO Amateur European Championships
List of male kickboxers

References

External links
Official site

1977 births
Living people
Serbian male kickboxers
Heavyweight kickboxers